Parodia ottonis, also known as Indian head cactus, is a cactus found in Argentina, Brazil, Paraguay and Uruguay. There are two recognized subspecies. The epithet ottonis honors the German botanist Christoph Friedrich Otto.

Description
The plant at first grows individually and later forms groups. The light to dark green or blue-green spherical shoots are often tapered towards the base. They reach diameters of 3 to 15 centimeters. The six to 16 distinct ribs are rounded or sharp-edged. There are usually only a few areoles on each rib . The bristle-like thorns that spring from them are straight, curved or twisted. The one to four central spines are brownish, reddish brown or yellowish and have a length of 0.8 to 4 centimeters. The four to 15 spines are whitish to yellowish or brownish and 0.5 to 3 centimeters long.

The usually yellow flowers, rarely orange-red or red, reach lengths of 5 to 6 centimeters and would appear in late summer. Its flower tube is covered with brownish wool and bristles. The scars are dark red. The thick-walled egg-shaped to short cylindrical fruits tear open. They have diameters from 0.9 to 1.3 centimeters. The fruits contain, often very numerous, bell-shaped, glossy black seeds, which are strongly humped.

Range
Parodia ottonis is common in southern Brazil, southern Paraguay, Uruguay, and northeastern Argentina.

Taxonomy
The first description as Cactus ottonis by Johann Georg Christian Lehmann was published in 1827. Nigel Paul Taylor presented the type 1987 in the genus Parodia . Other nomenclatural synonyms are Echinocactus ottonis (Lehm.) Link & Otto (1830), Malacocarpus ottonis (Lehm.) Britton & Rose (1922), Notocactus ottonis (Lehm.) A.Berger ( 1929) and Peronocactus ottonis (Lehm.)

The following subspecies are distinguished:

Parodia ottonis subsp. ottonis
Parodia ottonis subsp. Horstii (F. Knight)

Gallery

References

ottonis
Cacti of South America
Flora of Argentina
Flora of Brazil
Flora of Paraguay
Flora of Uruguay
Garden plants
Ornamental plants
Garden plants of South America
Plants described in 1827